The Imperial German Army  Zeppelin LZ 78 (L-34) was a R-class World War I zeppelin.

Operational history 
The airship took part in three reconnaissance missions and two attacks on England dropping  of bombs. It also took part in the Zeppelin raid involving three other Imperial German Airships: the LZ 72 (L 31), L 32 and Zeppelin LZ 76 (L 33) on the evening of 23 September 1916. Of the four Airships, LZ 78 was the only Zeppelin that returned to base after the raid. Together all four Zepellins succeeded in dropping  of bombs on London and surrounding counties.

Last mission 

On 27 November 1916, Zeppelin LZ 78 was intercepted and destroyed by British fighter pilot Second Lieutenant Ian Pyott in Royal Aircraft Factory B.E.2c (Serial no. 2738) off Hartlepool. His bullets ignited the hydrogen, "like a massive fiery torch which lit up the night for miles around, she plunged into the sea." The commander of the Airship was Kapitanleutnant Max Dietrich the uncle of famous actress Marlene Dietrich.

Specifications (LZ 78 / Type R zeppelin)

See also

List of Zeppelins

Bibliography 
Notes

References
 - Total pages: 80
 - Total pages: 512 
 
 - Total pages: 96

 
 

Airships of Germany
Hydrogen airships
Zeppelins
Aviation accidents and incidents in 1916
Accidents and incidents involving balloons and airships